Lor is a village in the Sisian Municipality of the Syunik Province in Armenia. The village is home to the house-museum of Hamo Sahyan, a famous Armenian poet native to Lor.

Demographics

Population 
Statistical Committee of Armenia reported its population as 420 in 2010, up from 355 at the 2001 census.

Gallery

References 

Populated places in Syunik Province